The Palaeontographical Society is a learned society, established in 1847, and is the oldest extant Society devoted to the advancement of palaeontological knowledge.

The Society publishes monographs that further its primary purpose, which is to promote the description and illustration of fossil floras and faunas from Great Britain and Ireland. Since starting publishing in March 1848 (Searles Valentine Wood's work ) the Society has published over 600 monographs.

History
The precursor of the Paleontographical Society was The London Clay Club, which was founded in 1836 by James Scott Bowerbank and six other naturalists; the Club was superseded in 1847 by the Palaeontographical Society. The first council of the Society was presided over by Sir Henry Thomas de la Beche. Initial membership included: Prof. Thomas Bell, Frederick E. Edwards, Sir Philip de Malpas Grey Egerton, Hugh Falconer, William H. Fitton, J.W. Flower, Prof. Edward Forbes, Levett Landon Boscawen Ibbetson, Charles Lyell, John Morris, Prof. John Phillips, Joseph Prestwich, Daniel Sharpe, James Smith, Nathaniel T. Wetherell and Alfred White; the Treasurer was Searles Wood, and Honorary Secretary was J.S. Bowerbank. Thirty-seven local secretaries were also appointed. Notable members of the Society included Robert Heddle, William King, Charles Maclaren, Gideon Mantell, Sir Roderick Murchison and Reverend Adam Sedgwick. The membership totalled almost 600 individuals and institutions. In the following years, eminent scientists such as Richard Owen, Charles Darwin, Robert Chambers and Laurent-Guillaume de Koninck joined the ranks of the Society.

Grants and awards
The Palaeontographical Society offers financial support for research dedicated to the taxonomy and systematic palaeontology of British and Irish fossils. The Edward Forbes Prize is awarded for publication excellence by early career researchers in the field of taxonomic and systematic palaeontology; is presented at the Society’s Annual General Meeting. The Richard Owen Research Fund assists with travel, visits to museums, field work, etc. within the Society’s remit.

The Palaeontographical Society Medal is awarded biennially in recognition of a sustained and important series of contributions to the taxonomic and systematic palaeontology of Great Britain and Ireland, especially those which address problems of palaeogeography, palaeoecology and phylogeny. Recipients are not limited to palaeontologists based in the UK and Ireland.

Palaeontographical Society Medal recipients have been:
 2014: Prof. William James Kennedy  (first recipient)
 2016: Dr Adrian W.A. Rushton
 2018: Dr Robert Owens
 2020: Prof. Jenny Clack

Famous contributors
Many famous names have published monographs through the Palaeontographical Society. Charles Darwin published his monograph on fossil barnacles, and Richard Owen set out his early descriptions of dinosaurs, as well as his monograph on Mesozoic fossil mammals.

Selected monographs published by the Society
 1851, Darwin's Fossil Lepadidae
 1855, Darwin's Fossil Balanidae and Verrucidae
 1865–1881, Owen's Fossil Reptilia of the Liassic
 1871, Owen's Fossil Mammals of the Liassic Formations
 1901–1918, Elles & Wood's British Graptolites
 2013, Mohibullah, M., Williams, M. & Zalasiewicz, J.A. Late Ordovician ostracods of the Girvan District, south-west Scotland. Monograph of the Palaeontographical Society London: pp. 1–40, pls 1–6 (Publ 640, part of Volume 167).
 2013, Copestake, P. & Johnson, B. Lower Jurassic foraminifera from the Llanbedr (Mochras Farm) borehole, north Wales, UK. Monograph of the Palaeontographical Society London: pp. 1–403, pls 1–21 (Publ 641, part of Volume 167).
 2014, Smith, A.S. & Benson, R.B.J. Osteology of Rhomaleosaurus thorntoni (Sauropterygia: Rhomaleosauridae) from the Lower Jurassic (Toarcian) of Northamptonshire, England. Monograph of the Palaeontographical Society London: pp. 1–40, pls 1–35 (Publ 642, part of Volume 168).
 2014, Donovan, S.K. & Fearnhead, F.E. The British Devonian Crinoidea. Part 1 – Introduction and Camerata. Monograph of the Palaeontographical Society London: pp. 1–55, pls 1–15 (Publ 643, part of Volume 168).
 2015, Smith, A.B. British Jurassic regular echinoids. Part 1 (Introduction, Cidaroida, Echinothurioida, Aspidodiadematoida and Pedinoida). Monograph of the Palaeontographical Society London: pp. 1–67, pls 1–41 (Publ 644, part of Volume 169).
 2015, Wright, C.W. & Kennedy, W.J. The Ammonoidea of the Lower Chalk. Part 6. Monograph of the Palaeontographical Society London: pp. 404–459, pls 125–145 (Publ 645, part of Volume 169).

Presidents of the society
 1847–?: Henry de la Beche (died 1855)
 c.1869 James Scott Bowerbank (died 1877)
 ?–1892: Richard Owen
 1892–1895: Thomas Henry Huxley
 1895–1921: Henry Woodward
 1921–1928: Edwin Tulley Newton
 1928–:
 1934–1942: Sir Arthur Smith Woodward
 1942–:
 1971–1974: Oliver Meredith Boone Bulman
 1974–:
 1989–1994: Michael Robert House
 1994–1998: Robin Cocks
 1998–: Prof. Chris Paul 
 2007–2009: Richard Fortey
 2009– 2012: Andrew B Smith
 2013–2018: Paul M. Barrett
 2019–2021: Stephen K. Donovan
 2021–present: Caroline Buttler

See also
James Scott Bowerbank
Ray Society

References

External links
https://www.palaeosoc.org/

Paleontological institutions and organizations
Paleontology in the United Kingdom
Scientific societies based in the United Kingdom
1847 establishments in the United Kingdom
Scientific organizations established in 1847